Popovac may refer to:

Places

Bosnia and Herzegovina
 Popovac (Čelinac), a village

Croatia
 Popovac, Osijek-Baranja County, a village and municipality in Croatia
 Popovac, Sisak-Moslavina County, a village near Novska
 Donji Popovac a village in Karlovac County
 Gornji Popovac, a village in Karlovac County
 Trnovitički Popovac, a village in Bjelovar-Bilogora County

Serbia
 Popovac (Niš), a village
 Popovac (Paraćin), a village
 Popovac (Veliko Gradište), a village
 Veliki Popovac, a village

People
 Ismet Popovac (died 1943), Bosnian Muslim lawyer and physician